Oksapmin Rural LLG is a local-level government (LLG) of Sandaun Province, Papua New Guinea. The Oksapmin language is spoken in the LLG.

Wards
01. Ranimap
02. Betianap
03. Divanap
04. Kuiva
05. Kusanap
06. Mitaganap
07. Tekap
08. Teranap
09. Tomianap
10. Seremty
11. Oksapmin Subdistrict
12. Bimin
13. Daburap
14. Duban
15. Kweptanap
16. Sungtem
17. Umanap
18. Akiapmin
19. Lembana
20. Monduban
21. Tomware

See also
Oksapmin language

References

Local-level governments of Sandaun Province